Franklin Spencer Miguel Bittencourt (born 24 February 1969) is a Brazilian former professional football striker who works as a scout and youth coach with Energie Cottbus.

Personal life
Bittencourt was born in Rio de Janeiro, Brazil.

After ending his professional career he played for lower league sides SV Victoria Seelow and Blau-Gelb Laubsdorf.

His son Leonardo is a professional footballer.

References

Living people
1969 births
Footballers from Rio de Janeiro (city)
Brazilian footballers
Association football forwards
Brazilian football managers
Clube Atlético Bragantino players
Fluminense FC players
1. FC Lokomotive Leipzig players
FC Energie Cottbus players
Bundesliga players
2. Bundesliga players
Brazilian expatriate footballers
Brazilian expatriate sportspeople in Germany
Expatriate footballers in Germany
Brazilian people of French descent